Jerzy Ernest Wijas (born 12 February 1959) is a Polish retired international footballer.

References

External links
 

Living people
Polish footballers
1959 births
Association football defenders
Association football midfielders
Poland international footballers
People from Mysłowice
GKS Katowice players
Widzew Łódź players
VfL Osnabrück players
VfB Lübeck players
Hapoel Haifa F.C. players
Hapoel Kfar Saba F.C. players